Ocybadistes walkeri, the greenish grass-dart, green grass-dart, southern dart or yellow-banded dart, is a type of butterfly known as a skipper found in eastern and southern Australia, with one subspecies found in the Northern Territory.

The larvae feed on Dianella, Brachypodium distachyon, Cynodon dactylon, Erharta erecta, Panicum maximum, Pennisetum clandestinum and Thuarea involuta.

Subspecies
Ocybadistes walkeri hypochlora (South Australia)
Ocybadistes walkeri olivia (Northern Territory, Western Australia)
Ocybadistes walkeri sothis (Australian Capital Territory, New South Wales, Queensland, South Australia, Tasmania, Victoria)

References

External links 
 

Taractrocerini
Butterflies described in 1894